The Idaho Falls Metropolitan Statistical Area, as defined by the United States Census Bureau, is an area consisting of two counties in eastern Idaho, anchored by the city of Idaho Falls. As of the 2020 census, the MSA had a population of 154,855.

Counties
Bonneville
Jefferson

Communities
Places with more than 50,000 inhabitants
Idaho Falls (Principal City)
Places with 10,000 to 50,000 inhabitants
Ammon
Places with 1,000 to 10,000 inhabitants
Iona
Rigby
Ucon
Places with 500 to 1,000 inhabitants
Menan
Ririe
Roberts
Places with fewer than 500 inhabitants
Hamer
Irwin
Lewisville
Mud Lake
Swan Valley
Unincorporated places
Osgood
Lincoln

Demographics
As of the census of 2000, there were 101,677 people, 34,654 households, and 26,329 families residing within the MSA. The racial makeup of the MSA was 92.43% White, 0.45% African American, 0.61% Native American, 0.71% Asian, 0.07% Pacific Islander, 4.29% from other races, and 1.44% from two or more races. Hispanic or Latino of any race were 7.48% of the population.

The median income for a household in the MSA was $39,796, and the median income for a family was $44,873. Males had a median income of $35,022 versus $21,135 for females. The per capita income for the MSA was $16,082.

Combined Statistical Area
The Idaho Falls–Blackfoot Combined Statistical Area is made up of three counties in eastern Idaho. The statistical area includes one metropolitan area and one micropolitan area. As of the 2020 Census, the CSA had a population of 202,847.

Components
Metropolitan Statistical Areas (MSAs)
Idaho Falls (Bonneville and Jefferson counties), 154,855 (2020)
Micropolitan Statistical Areas (μSAs)
Blackfoot (Bingham County), 47,992 (2020)

Demographics
As of the census of 2000, there were 143,412 people, 47,971 households, and 37,035 families residing within the CSA. The racial makeup of the CSA was 89.52% White, 0.37% African American, 2.39% Native American, 0.67% Asian, 0.06% Pacific Islander, 5.36% from other races, and 1.64% from two or more races. Hispanic or Latino of any race were 9.18% of the population.

The median income for a household in the CSA was $38,672, and the median income for a family was $43,353. Males had a median income of $33,998 versus $21,287 for females. The per capita income for the CSA was $15,510.

See also
Idaho census statistical areas

References

 
Metropolitan areas of Idaho